

The New Standard D-29 was a trainer aircraft produced in the US from 1929 to 1930. It was a conventional biplane design with a fuselage constructed from duralumin members riveted and bolted together, and the wings were made with spruce spars and bass-wood and plywood built-up ribs. Deliberately built to be rugged and simple the D-29 was moderately successful, but had to compete with the Swallow TP.

Variants
Data from: Aerofiles
D-29initial version 85 hp Cirrus III engine, one built.
D-29Aproduction aircraft with  Kinner K-5. Six supplied to US Navy as the NT-1 trainer in 1930.(Note: The US Navy designation NT-2 does not refer to a version of the D-29, but to two New Standard D-25s captured from smugglers and used by the US Coast Guard).
D-29 SpecialD-29A with Menasco B-4.
D-29S – Sport version with coupe cockpit (also known as D-25C).
D-31 SpecialD-29A with Kinner B-5.
D-32 Specialthree-seater D-29A with Wright J-6.
D-33 Specialthree-seater D-29A with Kinner B-5.
NT-1Six D-29A trainers supplied to the US Navy.

Operators

United States Navy

Specifications (D-29A)

See also

References

External links

1920s United States civil trainer aircraft